Education in Missouri is provided by both public and private schools, colleges, and universities, and a variety of public library systems. All public education in the state is governed by the Missouri State Board of Education, which is made up of eight citizens appointed by the Governor of Missouri and confirmed by the Missouri Senate.

History

Elementary and secondary education

Administration of primary and secondary public schools in the state is conducted by the Missouri Department of Elementary and Secondary Education. Education is compulsory from ages seven to seventeen in Missouri, commonly but not exclusively divided into three tiers: elementary school, middle school or junior high school, and high school. The public schools system includes kindergarten to 12th grade. District territories are often complex in structure. In some cases, elementary, middle and junior high schools of a single district feed into high schools in another district. High school athletics and competitions are governed by the Missouri State High School Activities Association (MSHAA).  Missouri education also includes a virtual school program called Missouri Course Access and Virtual School Program (MOCAP).

The Missouri Assessment Program (MAP) is an annual set of mandatory standardized tests taken by students in grades 3 through 8. Students also complete exams at the end of completing certain courses, with certain exams required for graduation, including Algebra I (required), Algebra II, American History, Biology (required), English I, English II (required), Geometry, Government (required), and Personal Finance. There also is an alternate MAP test designed for students with cognitive disabilities who meet grade level and eligibility criteria, and an assessment of English proficiency for students classified as English Learners.

Homeschooling

Homeschooling in Missouri is not regulated by the Department of Elementary and Secondary Education. The state does not provide any monetary assistance or curriculum or materials to home schoolers. Parents who decide to home-school must provide 1,000 hours of instruction during the school year pursuant to Section 167.031 of the Missouri revised statutes. Parents must also keep a daily log and sample of academic work. Homeschool students frequently attend their local colleges and universities. According to Missouri State University's Enrollment department, homeschool students had higher than average ACT scores and better end-of-semester GPA than their peers.

Charter schools 
Charter schools are permitted in metropolitan and urban areas of the state. The state board of education considers them public schools and there are no tuition charges.

Colleges and universities

Public colleges and universities in Missouri are administered by the Missouri Department of Higher Education. The state system of higher education includes 13 four-year universities and 20 two-year colleges, which includes the University of Missouri System, the state's public university system. The flagship institution and largest university in the state is the University of Missouri in Columbia. The others in the system are University of Missouri–St. Louis, University of Missouri–Kansas City and Missouri University of Science and Technology. The state also maintains another set of public universities that are not part of the University of Missouri system, which include Southeast Missouri State University in Cape Girardeau, Missouri State University in Springfield, Truman State University in Kirksville, Northwest Missouri State University in Maryville and the University of Central Missouri in Warrensburg. The state also funds a $2000, renewable merit-based scholarship known as Bright Flight, which is given to Missouri students attending an in-state university who earned a composite score on the ACT or SAT in the top 3 percent in Missouri, or a score among the top 5% of test takers nationally.
 
Private universities in Missouri include Saint Louis University, Washington University in St. Louis, Maryville University and Rockhurst University in Kansas City. There are numerous junior colleges, trade schools, theological seminaries, and church universities.

See also
Missouri A+ schools program
Missouri State Board of Education

References